Balykcha (Balıkçı) is a rural locality (a selo) and the administrative centre of Chelushmanskoye Rural Settlement of Ulagansky District, the Altai Republic, Russia. The population was 863 as of 2016. There are 9 streets.

Geography 
Balykcha is located on the Chulyshman River, 115 km north of Ulagan (the district's administrative centre) by road. Kordon Atyshtu is the nearest rural locality.

References 

Rural localities in Ulagansky District